Brzeziny-Kolonia  is a village in the administrative district of Gmina Poczesna, within Częstochowa County, Silesian Voivodeship, in southern Poland.

The village has a population of 499.

References

Brzeziny-Kolonia